Gaoligongshan Tunnel or Gaoligong Mountain Rail Tunnel is a  tunnel between Nujiang Station and Longling Station on the Dali–Ruili railway in Yunnan, China. It passes through the entirety of Longling County and then into Mangshi. Upon completion, it will be the longest mountain railway tunnel in Asia.

The tunnel is the key project of Yunnan–Burma railway between Dali and Ruili. 

Construction started on 1 December 2015. The tunnel boring machine "Colorful Cloud No.1"() began work on 28 August 2017.

Notes

References

Rail transport in Yunnan
Transport in Baoshan, Yunnan
Railway tunnels in China